The Kids Book of Aboriginal Peoples in Canada is a book written by Diane Silvey and illustrated by John Mantha, about Canada's First Nations. The book discusses how the Natives were influenced by the contact with European settlers, and how they formed the League of Six Nations, and how residential schools were set up in the 1800s for Aboriginals. It was first published in 2005. It is published by Kids Can Press.

Chapters
 Introduction
 Peoples of the NW Coast
 Peoples of the Plateau
 Peoples of the Subarctic
 Peoples of the Plains
 Peoples of the Arctic
 Iroquonians of the E Woodlands
 Algonquians of the E Woodlands
 Aboriginal Peoples after Contact
 Index

References

2005 children's books
Canadian children's books
First Nations culture
First Nations history
History books about Canada
Children's history books